Northern Chad offensive may refer to:
 The 2021 Northern Chad offensive, initiated by the Chadian rebel group Front for Change and Concord in Chad (FACT), between 11 April and 9 May 2021
 The 2016 insurgency by FACT and the Military Command Council for the Salvation of the Republic (CCMSR)
 The 1978-1987 Chadian–Libyan conflict, fought between Libyan and allied Chadian forces against Chadian groups supported by France